The term "Marcos mansions" refers to at least 50 upscale residences in the Philippines of the family of President  Ferdinand Marcos. These are aside from the various overseas landholdings of the Marcos family, which are spread around the world. The Supreme Court of the Philippines considers these landholdings as part of the "ill-gotten wealth" of the Marcos family, based on the definitions set forth in Republic Act No. 1379, which had been passed in 1955.

Background

The Supreme Court's interpretation of R.A. 1379 says that property acquired by a public officer or employee which is "manifestly out of proportion to his salary as such public officer and to his other lawful income" is "presumed prima facie to have been unlawfully acquired." The bulk of the assets of the Marcoses, including the Marcos jewels, were treated as "ill gotten" in a 2012 decision which specified that "according to the Official Report of the Minister of Budget, the total salaries of former President Marcos as President from 1966 to 1976 was ₱60,000 a year and from 1977 to 1985, ₱100,000 a year; while that of the former First Lady, Imelda R. Marcos, as Minister of Human Settlements from June 1976 to February 22–25, 1986, was ₱75,000 a year" – about $304,372.  The PCGG in its reports would state that the lawful tax declared income of the Marcos couple only amounted from 1960 to 1984 would only amount to PhP 8,148,289.42.

Along with the Marcos jewels, their overseas landholdings, art collection, and Imelda Marcos's shoe hoard, the Marcos mansions are frequently cited to illustrate the Marcos family's wanton spending during the dictatorship.  Because the estimated cost of these mansions is much more than the income recorded in Marcos’ sworn statement of assets and liabilities (SALN), the number, size, and opulence of these mansions is interpreted by the Philippine government as prima facie evidence that the Marcoses plundered the Philippine economy.

Some of these properties are titled in the name of Marcos family members, but others are titled in the name of identified “Marcos cronies,” but reserved for the use of the Marcos family.  In some cases, several such mansions were located close together, with specific mansions meant for individual members of the family, as was the case of the Marcos mansions on Outlook Drive in Baguio. Many of the Marcos mansions were sequestered by the Philippine government when the Marcoses were expelled from the country as a result of the 1986 EDSA Revolution.

In 2009, Imelda Marcos filed graft charges against PCGG for "illegally confiscating" their family's assets.  In question were more than 197 individual certificate of titles within the country, totaling 17,405,984 sq. meters.

Locations 

Locations of houses considered "Marcos mansions" include properties in Baguio, in the Ilocos region where the Marcoses trace their ancestry, Leyte where Imelda Marcos's family came from, and throughout the Greater Manila Area and its outskirts.

Baguio properties
Among roughly 50 Marcos mansions scattered throughout the Philippines, the nine properties located in Baguio are among the most commonly covered by media reports, because of their reported opulence and because of their closeness to each other and to major tourist attractions: including Mines View Park, Wright Park, and the Baguio mansion house which was constructed in the early 1900s to be the summer residence of the Philippine head of state.

Located on the same road is a two-story house called the "Lualhati residence", whose title was held by Marcos crony, Jose Y. Campos, on behalf of the Marcoses.  Another property, the Banaue Inn compound, is located just behind the Campos house.

Metro Manila properties
Closer to the main seat of power, Marcos mansions were located in Makati, Parañaque, Manila, and San Juan. Houses were once again designated for each of the three Marcos children: a residence in Seaside subdivision, Parañaque was designated for Bongbong Marcos, one in Wack-Wack, Mandaluyong was designated for Imee Marcos, while a house in Forbes Park, Makati, was designated for Irene Marcos.

Marcos mansions in other provinces
Other locations where Marcos mansions were built include several in Ilocos Norte and Leyte, the home provinces of Ferdinand and Imelda Marcos respectively; and in Mariveles, Bataan, and in Cavite.

Particularly notable is the Malacañang of the North mansion in Paoay, Ilocos Norte, which was built by the Philippine Tourism Authority (PTA) in 1977, in time for Ferdinand Marcos's 60th birthday.  The Sandiganbayan anti-graft court stripped the Marcoses of the property in 2014, voiding a 1978 agreement between Marcos and the then PTA, deciding that since it is a national park, the Marcos family had no legal rights over it since national parks are "inalienable public domain". Bongbong Marcos objected to the decision, saying the property was owned by the family.

In Tolosa, Leyte, a muti-million dollar seaside resort was constructed in 1974, in time for the Marcoses to entertain  participants of the 1974 Miss Universe beauty contest, which was being held in the Philippines that year.  The property was severely damaged by Typhoon Haiyan in 2013.

A different mansion, in Tacloban, is noted for having been the former site of the "impoverished quonset hut"  which was Imelda Marcos's childhood home.  When her husband became president of the Philippines, Imelda transformed the site into a 2000 square meter mansion with a shrine to the Santo Niño and a museum, which has since been dubbed the "Santo Niño Shrine and Heritage Museum". The site was less damaged by Typhoon Haiyan than the Olot mansion was, but still sustained at least PhP20 million worth of damages. The Philippine Commission on Good Government, which had sequestered the property, decided to repair the site since it had been converted to a tourist site which was a major money-earner for Leyte.

There is also what is known as the Marcos Twin Mansion built by Imelda Marcos in Casile, Calamba, on the property donated by Jose Yulo, for their 25th Wedding Anniversary. Ferdinand Marcos in turn gifted Imelda with 25 gold bullions.

Ferdinand Marcos also expropriated Talaga Beach in Mariveles, Bataan for his family's exclusive use. The beach estate sequestered by the PCGG.

Use of government money for construction and maintenance
Verification by the Philippine government's Commission on Audit after the ouster of the Marcos family revealed that the construction, renovation, and maintenance of these various houses were paid for by the Philippine government through the office of the President.  Maintenance and upkeep alone cost at least US$3.2 million in 1984 and US$10.5 million in 1985, all at prevailing exchange rates and not yet adjusted for inflation.

According to the calculations of author Ricardo Manapat, this would have been sufficient to feed "a small town of 48,000 people," or "8,000 starving families of 6" for a year.

List

See also 
 Stolen wealth of the Marcos family
 Marcos jewels
 Overseas landholdings of the Marcos family
 Malacañang of the North
 The Mansion (Baguio)
 Cronies of Ferdinand Marcos

References

Mansions